Macrenteron is a genus of colonial sea squirts, tunicates in the family Polyclinidae.

Species
The World Register of Marine Species lists the following species:
Macrenteron ritteri Redikorzev, 1927

References

Enterogona
Tunicate genera